Sergo Kldiashvili (18 October 1893 – 1986) was a Georgian and Soviet prose-writer who set out to be Symbolist but then was drawn to conformist Realist prose under Soviet rule.

He was the son of the noted novelist David Kldiashvili whom Sergo would dedicate a special book in 1945. He attended the Kutaisi gymnasium which produced many of Georgia's 20th-century intellectuals, and then studied law in Moscow. Returning to Georgia, he joined Grigol Robakidze’s Symbolist group Blue Horns and wrote in a moderately The Adventures of Squire Lakhundareli (აზნაურ ლახუნდარელის თავგადასავალი, 1927), the plays A Generation of Heroes (გმირთა თაობა, 1937), Deer’s Gorge (ირმის ხევი, 1944).

References 

Rayfield, Donald (2000), The Literature of Georgia: A History: 2nd edition, p. 246. Routledge, .

1893 births
1986 deaths
20th-century dramatists and playwrights from Georgia (country)
20th-century writers from Georgia (country)
People from Kutais Governorate
Recipients of the Order of the Red Banner of Labour
Dramatists and playwrights from Georgia (country)
Male writers from Georgia (country)
Soviet dramatists and playwrights
Soviet male writers
Burials at Didube Pantheon